The National Museum of Montserrat is a national museum focusing on the history of Montserrat, Lesser Antilles.

It is located on the Main Road in Little Bay, and opens for visitors upon request.

It was opened in 2012.

There is no official website.

See also 
 List of national museums

References

History of Montserrat
Museums established in 2012
Museums in Montserrat
Montserrat